The neuromedin U receptors are two G-protein coupled receptors which bind the neuropeptide hormones neuromedin U and neuromedin S. There are two subtypes of the neuromedin U receptor, each encoded by a separate gene.

Selective Ligands
Neuromedin U is an agonist at both the NMU1 and NMU2 subtypes, while neuromedin S is selective for NMU2, and is a more potent agonist at this subtype than neuromedin U. Several other peptide and non-peptide ligands are also available for the NMU receptors.

Agonists
Non-selective
 Neuromedin U
 non-peptide NMU modulators 

NMU2 selective
 Neuromedin S

Antagonists
NMU2 selective
 R-PSOP

References

External links

 

G protein-coupled receptors